Killington Lake Services is a motorway service station on the M6 motorway between Junctions 37 and 36 near Killington Lake in Cumbria, England. It was opened in 1972.

It is owned by Roadchef. It comprises a BP petrol station, a Days Inn and a main facilities building with a Costa Coffee outlet and WHSmith newsagents. A McDonald's restaurant opened here in March 2014. It is only accessible to southbound traffic only therefore to access the services while travelling north, it is necessary to continue up to Junction 37 and then come off, turn round, and head all the way back down. However, northbound traffic can use the northbound-only Burton-in-Kendal services ten miles to the south of Killington Lake Services, or Tebay Services ten miles to the north.

References

External links 
Motorway Services Online - Killington Lake
Motorway Services Trivia Website - Killington Lake

M6 motorway service stations
RoadChef motorway service stations
Transport in Cumbria
Westmorland
South Lakeland District